Denis Nikolayevich Iartsev (born 18 September 1990) is a Russian judoka. He competed at the 2016 Summer Olympics in the men's 73 kg event, in which he was eliminated by Lasha Shavdatuashvili in the repechage.

References

External links
 
 

1990 births
Living people
Russian male judoka
Olympic judoka of Russia
Judoka at the 2016 Summer Olympics
Russian sportspeople in doping cases
Sportspeople from Chelyabinsk
Universiade gold medalists for Russia
Universiade medalists in judo
Judoka at the 2015 European Games
Judoka at the 2019 European Games
European Games medalists in judo
European Games gold medalists for Russia
European Games bronze medalists for Russia
Medalists at the 2011 Summer Universiade
21st-century Russian people